Gatterer  may refer to:

People

 Bat-El Gatterer (born 1988), Israeli taekwondo athlete
 Christoph Wilhelm Jacob Gatterer (1759-1838), German historian
 Johann Christoph Gatterer (1727-1799), German historian